Bordentown is a city in Burlington County, in the U.S. state of New Jersey. As of the 2020 United States census, the city's population was 3,993, an increase of 69 (+1.8%) from the 2010 census count of 3,924, which in turn reflected a decline of 45 (−1.1%) from the 3,969 counted in the 2000 census.

Bordentown is located at the confluence of the Delaware River, Blacks Creek, and Crosswicks Creek. The latter is the border between Burlington and Mercer counties. Bordentown is the northernmost municipality in New Jersey that is considered a part of the Philadelphia-Camden-Wilmington Metropolitan Statistical Area.

Bordentown's first recorded European settlement was made in 1682 in what became known as Farnsworth's Landing and, after 1717, the town that had developed in the Provence of New Jersey was renamed to Borden's Town. Following the revolution and the establishment of the New Jersey state government, Bordentown was incorporated with a borough government form by an act of its legislature on December 9, 1825, from portions within Chesterfield Township. It was reincorporated with a city government form on April 3, 1867, and it was separated from Chesterfield Township about 1877.

History
Thomas Farnsworth, an English Quaker, was credited with being the first European settler in the Bordentown area in 1682, when he moved his family up river from Burlington. He made a new home on the windswept bluff overlooking the broad bend in the Delaware River. The Farnsworth's cabin was situated near the northwest corner of Park Street and Prince Street, perhaps where an 1883 frame house now stands. "Farnsworth Landing" soon became the center of trade for the region. Farnsworth is also the namesake of one of Bordentown's main streets, Farnsworth Avenue.

Joseph Borden, for whom the city is named, arrived in 1717, and by May 1740 founded a transportation system to carry people and freight between New York City and Philadelphia. This exploited Bordentown's natural location as the point on the Delaware River that provided the shortest overland route to Perth Amboy, from which cargo and people could be ferried to New York City.

By 1776, Bordentown was full of revolutionaries. Patience Lovell Wright, America's first female sculptor, was creating wax busts in King George's court in England. Later, however, Bordentown became a rabble-rousing hotbed. In addition to Joseph Borden's son (also named Joseph Borden), who became a colonel during the war, patriots Francis Hopkinson (a signer of the United States Declaration of Independence), Colonel Kirkbride, Colonel Oakey Hoagland, and Thomas Paine resided in the area. Due to their well-published activity in Bordentown, the British retaliated. Hessians occupied the town in 1776, and the British pillaged and razed the town during May and June 1778.

Other notable people who have lived in the city include Clara Barton, who in 1852 started the first free public school in New Jersey and later founded the American Red Cross. A recreation of her schoolhouse stands at the corner of Crosswicks and Burlington streets.

The Bordentown School operated from 1894 to 1955.

Joseph Bonaparte

Several years after the banishing of his family from France in 1816, arriving under vigilant disguise as the Count de Survilliers, Joseph Bonaparte, former King of Naples and Spain and brother to Napoleon I of France, purchased the Point Breeze Estate near Bordentown from American revolutionary, Stephen Sayre. He lived there for 17 years, entertaining guests of great fame such as Henry Clay, Daniel Webster and the future 6th U.S. President, John Quincy Adams. The residents of Bordentown nicknamed the Count, "The Good Mr. Bonaparte" (Good to distinguish him from his younger brother). On the bluff above it he built a new home, "Point Breeze". The current Divine Word Mission occupies its former site along Park Street.

Today only vestiges of the Bonaparte estate remain. Much of it is the remains of a formerly Italinate building remodeled in English Georgian Revival style in 1924 for Harris Hammon, who purchased the estate at Point Breeze as built in 1850 by Henry Becket, a British consul in Philadelphia. In addition to the rubble of this mansion and some hedges of its elaborate gardens, only the original tunnel to the river (broken through in several places) and the house of Bonaparte's secretary remain. Many descendants of Joachim Murat, King of Naples and brother in law of the Bonapartes executed in 1815, also were born or lived in Bordentown, having followed their uncle Joseph there. After the Bonaparte dynasty was restored by Napoleon III, they moved back to France and were recognized as princes.

In August 1831, master mechanic Isaac Dripps of Bordentown re-assembled (without blueprints or instructions) the locomotive John Bull (originally called "The Stevens") in just 10 days. It was built by Robert Stephenson and Company, in England, and was imported into Philadelphia by the Camden and Amboy Railroad.  The next year it started limited service, and the year after that regular service, to become one of the first successful locomotives in the United States. The John Bull is preserved at the Smithsonian Institution in Washington, D.C.

In 1866, Susan Waters moved into what is now one of the larger properties on Mary Street.  This was a base from which she taught and produced over 50 of her works, many of which are painting of animals in natural settings and pastoral scenes.  She was also an early photographer. In 1876 she was asked to exhibit several of her works at the Philadelphia Centennial Exposition.

In 1881, Rev. William Bowen purchased the old Spring Villa Female Seminary building (built on land purchased from the Bonapartes in 1837) and reopened it as the Bordentown Military Institute. In 1886, African-American Rev. Walter A. Rice established a private school for African-American children, the Manual Training and Industrial School for Colored Youth, in a two-story house at 60 West Street, which later moved to Walnut Street on the banks of the Delaware, and became a public school in 1894 under Jim Crow laws.

In 1909, the religious order Poor Clares established a convent in the former Motherhouse of the Sisters of Mercy on Crosswicks Street.  The building still stands and is used as an assisted living community called The Clare Estate.  The Order of Poor Clares moved to a new facility outside Bordentown City.

Geography
According to the United States Census Bureau, the city had a total area of 0.97 square miles (2.52 km2), including 0.93 square miles (2.42 km2) of land and 0.04 square miles (0.10 km2) of water (4.02%).

The City of Bordentown is surrounded on three sides by Bordentown Township and on the western side by the juncture of the Delaware River and Crosswicks Creek, which is the border with Hamilton Township in Mercer County. It is bounded on the east by U.S. Route 130 and U.S. Route 206, on the south by Black's Creek and Interstate 295, and on the north by the Mile Hollow Run. Across the Delaware River is Falls Township in Bucks County, Pennsylvania.

Demographics

2010 census

The Census Bureau's 2006–2010 American Community Survey showed that (in 2010 inflation-adjusted dollars) median household income was $66,557 (with a margin of error of +/− $9,567) and the median family income was $90,165 (+/− $11,644). Males had a median income of $52,652 (+/− $10,201) versus $48,906 (+/− $9,108) for females. The per capita income for the borough was $36,814 (+/− $3,714). About 1.7% of families and 3.6% of the population were below the poverty line, including none of those under age 18 and 12.1% of those age 65 or over.

2000 census
As of the 2000 United States census there were 3,969 people, 1,757 households, and 989 families residing in the city. The racial makeup of the city was 81.25% White, 13.08% African American, 0.05% Native American, 1.91% Asian, 0.03% Pacific Islander, 0.81% from other races, and 2.87% from two or more races. Hispanic or Latino of any race were 2.82% of the population.

There were 1,757 households, out of which 24.9% had children under the age of 18 living with them, 39.2% were married couples living together, 13.1% had a female householder with no husband present, and 43.7% were non-families. 35.7% of all households were made up of individuals, and 10.9% had someone living alone who was 65 years of age or older. The average household size was 2.23 and the average family size was 2.93.

In the city the population was spread out, with 20.9% under the age of 18, 7.7% from 18 to 24, 34.2% from 25 to 44, 23.2% from 45 to 64, and 14.0% who were 65 years of age or older. The median age was 38 years. For every 100 females, there were 90.1 males. For every 100 females age 18 and over, there were 86.5 males.

The median income for a household in the city was $47,279, and the median income for a family was $59,872. Males had a median income of $39,909 versus $31,780 for females. The per capita income for the city was $25,882. About 4.0% of families and 6.8% of the population were below the poverty line, including 7.8% of those under age 18 and 10.9% of those age 65 or over.

Economy
Downtown Bordentown has many book, record and antique stores lining its streets, with Italian and American restaurants. The restaurants are primarily Italian, but there are also restaurants and diners that specialize in American food, Chinese food, and more recently Japanese and Latin-American food.

Government

Local government

Bordentown has been governed under the Walsh Act since 1913. The city is one of 30 municipalities (of the 564) statewide that use this commission form of government. The governing body is comprised of three commissioners, one of whom is selected to serve as Mayor. Each commissioner is assigned a specific department to oversee during their term in office. Members are elected at-large to four-year concurrent terms of office on a non-partisan basis as part of the May municipal election.

, Bordentown's commissioners are
Mayor Jennifer L. Sciortino (Director of Revenue and Finance), 
Deputy Mayor Joe Myers (Director of Public Property, Streets and Water) and
Commissioner James L. Lynch Jr. (Director of Public Safety and Affairs), all serving terms of office that end on May 13, 2025.

The city's municipal complex is located on the site of the Point Breeze estate. Part of the site was purchased by the city in 2020 from the Divine Word Missionaries who occupied the  site previously. The repurposed building opened in August 2022. The former city hall was located at 324 Farnsworth Avenue.

Emergency services
Hope Hose Humane Fire Company 1 dates its founding to 1767, making it the nation's second-oldest volunteer fire service, having taken its current name from the combination in 1976 of the Hope Hose and the Humane fire companies.

Consolidated Fire Association dates back to the 1966 merger of three separate volunteer fire companies.

Environmental Commission
The Bordentown City Environmental Commission (BCEC) is a volunteer group of Bordentown City residents. The Commission is an official body, and its chair answers to the Mayor.  The BCEC advises local officials and the Planning Board regarding environmental issues and is a watchdog for environmental problems and opportunities. It is designed to inform elected officials and the public, serve on committees, research issues, develop educational programs and advocate for sound environmental policies.  Local issues include preservation of open space, promoting walking and bicycling trails and the River Line, protection of wetlands and water quality, recycling and energy conservation, and environmental education.

The BCEC's most current efforts have focuses upon a bicycle and pedestrian circulation study, the City's open space plan, and the development of a set of local greenways (Thorntown and Black Creek).

State government facilities 
The New Jersey Juvenile Justice Commission operates two juvenile detention centers in the Johnstone Campus in Bordentown: Johnstone Campus Juvenile Female Secure Care and Intake Facility, which houses the state's adjudicated girls, and Juvenile Medium Security Facility-North Compound (JMSF-N) and the Juvenile Medium Security Facility-South Compound (JMSF-S) for boys.

Federal, state and county representation
Bordentown City is located in the 3rd Congressional District and is part of New Jersey's 7th state legislative district. Prior to the 2011 reapportionment following the 2010 Census, Bordentown City had been in the 30th state legislative district.

 

Burlington County is governed by a Board of County Commissioners comprised of five members who are chosen at-large in partisan elections to serve three-year terms of office on a staggered basis, with either one or two seats coming up for election each year; at an annual reorganization meeting, the board selects a director and deputy director from among its members to serve a one-year term. , Burlington County's Commissioners are
Director Felicia Hopson (D, Willingboro Township, term as commissioner ends December 31, 2024; term as director ends 2023),
Deputy Director Tom Pullion (D, Edgewater Park, term as commissioner and as deputy director ends 2023),
Allison Eckel (D, Medford, 2025),
Daniel J. O'Connell (D, Delran Township, 2024) and 
Balvir Singh (D, Burlington Township, 2023). 
Burlington County's Constitutional Officers are
County Clerk Joanne Schwartz (R, Southampton Township, 2023)
Sheriff James H. Kostoplis (D, Bordentown, 2025) and 
Surrogate Brian J. Carlin (D, Burlington Township, 2026).

Politics
As of March 2011, there were a total of 2,493 registered voters in Bordentown City, of which 906 (36.3% vs. 33.3% countywide) were registered as Democrats, 500 (20.1% vs. 23.9%) were registered as Republicans and 1,085 (43.5% vs. 42.8%) were registered as Unaffiliated. There were 2 voters registered as either Libertarians or Greens. Among the city's 2010 Census population, 63.5% (vs. 61.7% in Burlington County) were registered to vote, including 77.9% of those ages 18 and over (vs. 80.3% countywide).

In the 2012 presidential election, Democrat Barack Obama received 1,298 votes (66.4% vs. 58.1% countywide), ahead of Republican Mitt Romney with 605 votes (31.0% vs. 40.2%) and other candidates with 34 votes (1.7% vs. 1.0%), among the 1,954 ballots cast by the city's 2,634 registered voters, for a turnout of 74.2% (vs. 74.5% in Burlington County). In the 2008 presidential election, Democrat Barack Obama received 1,305 votes (64.8% vs. 58.4% countywide), ahead of Republican John McCain with 669 votes (33.2% vs. 39.9%) and other candidates with 25 votes (1.2% vs. 1.0%), among the 2,015 ballots cast by the city's 2,543 registered voters, for a turnout of 79.2% (vs. 80.0% in Burlington County). In the 2004 presidential election, Democrat John Kerry received 1,151 votes (58.7% vs. 52.9% countywide), ahead of Republican George W. Bush with 778 votes (39.7% vs. 46.0%) and other candidates with 17 votes (0.9% vs. 0.8%), among the 1,961 ballots cast by the city's 2,488 registered voters, for a turnout of 78.8% (vs. 78.8% in the whole county).

In the 2013 gubernatorial election, Republican Chris Christie received 661 votes (51.0% vs. 61.4% countywide), ahead of Democrat Barbara Buono with 579 votes (44.7% vs. 35.8%) and other candidates with 30 votes (2.3% vs. 1.2%), among the 1,295 ballots cast by the city's 2,658 registered voters, yielding a 48.7% turnout (vs. 44.5% in the county). In the 2009 gubernatorial election, Democrat Jon Corzine received 714 ballots cast (50.1% vs. 44.5% countywide), ahead of Republican Chris Christie with 553 votes (38.8% vs. 47.7%), Independent Chris Daggett with 86 votes (6.0% vs. 4.8%) and other candidates with 54 votes (3.8% vs. 1.2%), among the 1,424 ballots cast by the city's 2,567 registered voters, yielding a 55.5% turnout (vs. 44.9% in the county).

Education

Public schools
Public school students in pre-kindergarten through twelfth grades attend the schools of the Bordentown Regional School District, which serves students from Bordentown City, Bordentown Township and Fieldsboro Borough. As of the 2020–21 school year, the district, comprised of five schools, had an enrollment of 2,373 students and 194.0 classroom teachers (on an FTE basis), for a student–teacher ratio of 12.2:1. Schools in the district (with 2020–21 enrollment data from the National Center for Education Statistics) are 
Clara Barton Elementary School with 235 students in grades K–2 (generally serves Bordentown City and the Holloway Meadows section of Bordentown Township), 
Peter Muschal Elementary School with 522 students in grades Pre-K–5 (generally serves remainder of Bordentown Township and the Borough of Fieldsboro), 
MacFarland Intermediate School with 243 students in grades 3–5, 
Bordentown Regional Middle School with 576 students in grades 6–8 and 
Bordentown Regional High School with 766 students in grades 9–12.  The district's board of education is comprised of nine members, who are elected directly by voters to serve three-year terms of office on a staggered basis, with three seats up for election each year. The board's nine seats are allocated based on the population of the constituent municipalities, with three seats assigned to Bordentown City.

The New Hanover Township School District, consisting of New Hanover Township (including its Cookstown area) and Wrightstown Borough, sends students to Bordentown Regional High School on a tuition basis for ninth through twelfth grades as part of a sending/receiving relationship that has been in place since the 1960s, with about 50 students from the New Hanover district being sent to the high school. As of 2011, the New Hanover district was considering expansion of its relationship to send students to Bordentown for middle school for grades 6–8.

Students from Bordentown, and from all of Burlington County, are eligible to attend the Burlington County Institute of Technology, a countywide public school district that serves the vocational and technical education needs of students at the high school and post-secondary level at its campuses in Medford and Westampton Township.

Private schools
Saint Mary School was a Catholic school serving students in Pre-K–8, that operated for over 100 years under the auspices of the Roman Catholic Diocese of Trenton. The school closed its doors in June 2013 due to the school's financial challenges in the face of enrollment that was half of the 220 students needed to remain financially viable.

The Bordentown Military Institute was located in the city from 1881 to 1972. The Society of the Divine Word fathers operated a minor seminary in Bordentown from 1947 to 1983.  One of its more notable alumni Douglas Palmer was the four-term mayor of Trenton, New Jersey, leaving office in 2009.

Transportation

Roads and highways

U.S. Route 130 and U.S. Route 206 run through very briefly and intersect at County Route 528 in the city. In addition to CR 528's western terminus in Bordentown, County Route 545 has its northern terminus in the city. The New Jersey Turnpike (Interstate 95) passes through neighboring Bordentown Township with access at interchange 7 to U.S. Route 206, which is signed as Bordentown-Trenton. Interstate 295 also passes through Bordentown Township and has two interchanges that take travelers into Bordentown: exit 56 and exit 57.

Public transportation
The Bordentown station at Park Street offers service between the Trenton Rail Station in Trenton and the Walter Rand Transportation Center (and other stations) in Camden, on NJ Transit's River Line Light rail system.

NJ Transit provides bus service in the township between Trenton and Philadelphia on the 409 route.

Religion
Bordentown City's one square mile is home to more than 10 houses of worship, including: American Presbyterian Church, B'nai Abraham Synagogue, Christ Episcopal Church, Dorothea Dix Unitarian Universalist Community, Ebenezer Full Gospel Community Church, First Baptist Church of Bordentown, First Presbyterian Church, Mount Zion AME Church, Saint Mary's Roman Catholic Church, Shiloh Baptist Church, Trinity United Methodist Church and Union Baptist Church.

Points of interest
The city has become a destination for weekend dining as well as for the casual perusal of its book and record stores, historical sites and art galleries.  The active downtown business association sponsors an annual Iris Festival & Art Show in early May, an annual Street Fair in mid- to late May, and an annual Cranberry Festival in early October.  The Bordentown Historical Society sponsors events, such as the Holiday House Tour and Peach Social. 

The Historical Society hosts exhibits at the Bordentown Friends Meeting House each year, and the 2022 exhibition consists of artifacts collected from Joseph Bonaparte which led to a visit from Philippe Étienne, the ambassador of France to the United States.

Crosswicks Creek Site III, an archaeological site from the American Revolutionary War era, was added to the National Register of Historic Places in 1990 for its significance in military and maritime history.

Point Breeze, the former estate of Joseph Bonaparte, was added to the NRHP in 1997 for its significance in architecture, landscape architecture, and politics/government.

Notable people

People who were born in, residents of, or otherwise closely associated with Bordentown include:

 Burgiss Allison (1753–1827), Chaplain of the United States House of Representatives from 1816–1820
 Ricardo Almeida (born 1976), Brazilian-American mixed martial artist and Brazilian jiu-jitsu grappler
 Al Aronowitz (1928–2005), rock journalist who claimed that Bob Dylan wrote his famous "Mr. Tambourine Man" in Aronowitz's former Berkeley Heights home
 Clara Barton (1821–1912), in 1852 started the first free public school in New Jersey and later founded the American Red Cross
 Charlotte Bonaparte (1802–1839), artist and daughter of Joseph Bonaparte, whose works included a series of landscape paintings of New Jersey scenes
 Joseph Bonaparte (1768–1844), King of Naples and Sicily, King of Spain and the Indies and brother to Napoleon I of France
 Denise Borino-Quinn (1964–2010), actress who played the role of  Ginny Sacramoni, the wife of New York mob boss Johnny Sack in The Sopranos
 Herb Conaway (born 1963), member of the New Jersey General Assembly who has represented the 7th Legislative District since 1988
 Erica Dambach (born 1975), head coach of Penn State Nittany Lions women's soccer team
 Robert Duncan (born 1948), Anglican bishop who was the first primate and archbishop of the Anglican Church in North America (ACNA), serving from June 2009 to June 2014
 Dionne Farris (born 1968), singer-songwriter best known for her work as a vocalist with the hip-hop group Arrested Development
 Samuel C. Forker (1821–1900), represented New Jersey's 2nd congressional district in the United States House of Representatives from 1871–1873
 Peter Gamble (1793–1814), midshipman who was killed in action at the Battle of Lake Champlain during the War of 1812
 Eric Gibbons (born 1966), artist and owner of The Firehouse Gallery of Bordentown and founder of Firehouse Publications
 Richard Watson Gilder (1844–1909), poet, author and editor of The Century Magazine
 Eric Hamilton (born 1953), retired American football coach, who was head football coach at The College of New Jersey from 1977 through 2012
 Francis Hopkinson (1737–1791), author who was one of the signers of the Declaration of Independence
 Joachim, 4th Prince Murat (1834–1901), Major-General in the French Army
 Gia Maione (1941–2013), singer who was the wife of singer Louis Prima
 Joseph R. Malone (born 1949), former member of the New Jersey General Assembly who served as Bordentown's mayor from 1973 to 1993 and 2013 to 2017
 Edward McCall (1790–1853), officer in the United States Navy during the War of 1812 who was awarded a Congressional Gold Medal
 Joseph Menna (born 1974), sculptor
 Rob Novak (born 1986), runner who specialized in the 800 meters
 Thomas Paine (1737–1809), American and French Revolution inspiration and author of many works, including "Common Sense" and "The Rights of Man"
 Chris Prynoski (born 1971), animator
 Joshua Shaw (1776–1860), English-American artist and inventor
 Harry W. Shipps (1926–2016), eighth Bishop of Georgia.
 Charles Stewart (1778–1869), United States Navy admiral, resided in Bordentown at the time of his death in 1869
 Ishod Wair (born 1991), professional skateboarder who was Thrasher magazine's Skater of the Year 2013
 Susan Waters (1823–1900), painter and photographer, who was active in the suffrage movement and in animal rights causes
 Joseph Wright (1756–1793), artist and engraver who is credited as the designer of the Liberty Cap Large Cent
 Patience Wright (1725–1786), America's first native-born sculptor
 Joshua M. Zeitz (born 1974), historian and writer who ran unsuccessfully for Congress in 2008 and served as a policy adviser to the Corzine Administration
 August Zeller (1863–1918), sculptor who was a student of Thomas Eakins and Auguste Rodin

References

External links

Bordentown Historical Society

 
1825 establishments in New Jersey
Cities in Burlington County, New Jersey
Populated places established in 1825
Walsh Act
New Jersey populated places on the Delaware River